Georges Aeschlimann (11 January 1920 – 10 November 2010) was a Swiss racing cyclist. He rode in the 1948 and 1949 Tour de France.

References

External links

1920 births
2010 deaths
Swiss male cyclists
Cyclists from Bern
Tour de Suisse stage winners